Israel Crisóstomo "Izzy" Alcántara (born May 6, 1971)  is a former Major League Baseball player for the Boston Red Sox and Milwaukee Brewers.

Minor leagues
Alcántara was signed as an amateur free agent by the Montreal Expos in 1990. In the minor leagues, Alcantara was very successful, with at least 27 home runs and an OPS of .940 or higher in each of his seasons from 1997 to 2001. He led the International League in home runs twice, with 36 in 2001 and 27 in 2002. His OPS of 1.023 in 2000 was the best in the International League. In all his minor league years he batted .283 with 239 home runs and 988 runs batted in.

Boston Red Sox
Alcántara's minor league success did not carry over to the little time he spent in the Major Leagues, as he played parts of two seasons for the Boston Red Sox, debuting in the major leagues on June 25, 2000. That season, he hit .289 with four home runs in 45 at bats. Despite some success at the plate, Alcántara quickly found himself deep on the Red Sox bench after irking Boston manager Jimy Williams by a perceived lack of hustle during a game against the Chicago White Sox. For a time, Williams refused to play Alcántara despite general manager Dan Duquette's insistence the outfielder be put in the lineup of a team that suffered from low power numbers.  In , Alcántara's average declined to .263 with no home runs in 38 at bats in Boston although he continued to smash AAA pitching.

Alcántara is remembered for an incident while he was playing with the Pawtucket Red Sox, Boston's AAA affiliate of the International League. On July 3, 2001, after being brushed back a second time by Scranton/Wilkes-Barre Red Barons pitcher Blas Cedeño, Alcántara turned around, kicking catcher Jeremy Salazar, karate-style, in the mask before charging the mound, throwing an unsuccessful punch at Cedeño before turning around as other players joined the fight until he was tackled by Kevin Orie. The incident cost Alcántara a six-game suspension and his spot on the International League's All Star squad.

Milwaukee Brewers
Before the  season, he was signed as a free agent by the Milwaukee Brewers, where he hit .250 with 2 home runs in 32 at bats. His final Major League game was on August 22, 2002 and he was released by the team after that season.

Later career

2003
Alcántara then played in 2003 with the Mexican League team Vaqueros Laguna but after agreeing a release with his Mexican team, he moved to the Korean league after he played 61 games with 14 home runs and a .341 batting average. He signed a US$100,000 contract with LG Twins including a US$30,000 signing bonus.

2004
He came back to Vaqueros Laguna for the 2004 season, but this time Vaqueros arranged a high buyout clause to his contract in order to have him the whole season. On 24 March 2004 he tied a Mexican league record after hitting 8 home runs in six games, tying the previous record set by the Mexican Héctor Espino in 1969. He was selected to play the Mexican home run derby where he made it to the final round losing to the American Morgan Burkhart 7-8. He finished the season leading the Mexican league in home runs with 27. After the Mexican league imposed a salary cap starting in the 2004 season, that Alcántara refused to accept, his was then suspended.

He returned to the Korean baseball for the 2004 season with Doosan Bears.
Playing the Korean playoff against the Kia Tigers and winning 2-0 but losing to Samsung Lions 1–3 and winning the league third place.

2005
He hit 15 home-runs in 44 games, with a batting average of .330, but was released for reasons never fully explained by the management. He later played with the Mexican team Rojos del Águila de Veracruz, posting a .281 with five home runs and 15 RBI in just 27 games. He then joined Rojos del Águila de Veracruz in July in the late part for the league playoffs fight but his team was disqualified by Tigres de la Angelópolis. 
Alcántara also played four games for the New Jersey Jackals of the independent Canadian-American Association of Professional Baseball, homering on 10 August before being released on 15 August.

2007
Alcántara contributed with the Colombian team Caimanes de Barranquilla 2007–08 league championship, when he hit a home run in the 10th inning of the fourth game of the best-of-7 series that his team swept.

Winter league
Alcantara played for the Dominican team Tigres del Licey from 1994–95 to the 2004–05 season, winning the 2004 Caribbean Series and the All-Star team selection. He led the Dominican Professional Baseball League in home runs in the 1999-00 season with six, and had 10 HR with 34 RBI and the 2002–03 when he hit 9 HR and had produced 21 RBI. He was released by Licey after hitting .171 with only 4 homers, but surpassing Alonzo Perry with 47 home runs with the Licey uniform and played with Leones del Escogido in the 2005–06 and finally with Estrellas Orientales and later for Gigantes del Cibao for the 2006-07 season, retiring in fourth place with 52 HR in the Dominican league. He acted as assistant coach for Tigres del Licey in the 2009–10 season.

Since 2015, Alcantara acted as assistant coach for Leones del Escogido and became a Christian.

References

External links

1971 births
Living people
Acereros de Monclova players
Boston Red Sox players
Burlington Bees players
Dominican Republic expatriate baseball players in Mexico
Dominican Republic expatriate baseball players in South Korea
Dominican Republic expatriate baseball players in Taiwan
Dominican Republic expatriate baseball players in the United States
Doosan Bears players
Dominican Republic Protestants
Gigantes del Cibao players
Gulf Coast Expos players
Harrisburg Senators players
Indianapolis Indians players
Leones de Yucatán players
LG Twins players
Major League Baseball players from the Dominican Republic
Major League Baseball right fielders
Mexican League baseball first basemen
Mexican League baseball outfielders
Milwaukee Brewers players
New Jersey Jackals players
Orlando Rays players
Pawtucket Red Sox players
People from Baní
Reading Phillies players
Rojos del Águila de Veracruz players
St. Petersburg Devil Rays players
Trenton Thunder players
Uni-President Lions players
Vaqueros Laguna players
West Palm Beach Expos players